In business or commerce, an order is a stated intention, either spoken or written, to engage in a commercial transaction for specific products or services. From a buyer's point of view it expresses the intention to buy and is called a purchase order. From a seller's point of view it expresses the intention to sell and is referred to as a sales order. When the purchase order of the buyer and the sales order of the seller agree, the orders become a contract between the buyer and seller.

Within an organization, it may be a work order for manufacturing, a preventive maintenance order, or an order to make repairs to a facility.

In many businesses, orders are used to collect and report costs and revenues according to well-defined purposes. Then it is possible to show for what purposes costs have been incurred.

Spoken orders
Businesses such as retail stores, restaurants and filling stations conduct business with their customers by accepting orders that are spoken or implied by the buyer's actions. Taking a shopping cart of merchandise to a check-out counter is an implied intent to buy the merchandise. Placing a take-out or eat-in order at a restaurant is a spoken purchase order. Putting gasoline in one's tank at a filling station is an implied order. The seller usually expects immediate payment by cash, check or credit card for these purchases, and the seller provides the buyer with a receipt for the payment. In legal terms, this form of business order is an "implied in fact contract".

Steps in commercial orders
In commerce, various business documents are used to record the negotiation of an agreement to buy and sell, record the agreement itself, and record compliance with the agreement and closure of the contract. An agreement to buy and sell is a form of contract.

There are five basic requirements for a contract to exist between two parties: agreement, voluntary, consideration, capacity, and legality. A sixth requirement of "in writing" sometimes applies.

The main concern for commercial orders is that there must be agreement (offer and acceptance) for the order to be a contract. Prior to this, businesses often record the details of negotiations by using a request for quotation, request for bid, sales quotation, or sales bid. Quotations are non-binding and part of the negotiation process. A request for bid can be binding or non-binding, depending on the terms of the bid.

Once an agreement or contract is in place, businesses record these as confirmed purchase orders and confirmed sales orders.

Uniform Commercial Code
In the US, Article 2 of the Uniform Commercial Code covers commercial contracts, and section 2-103 gives definitions of terms under this code. Section 2-106 describes the difference between a present sale (recorded as a sales order) and a sale (recorded as a transfer of title to the buyer).

(1) In this Article unless the context otherwise requires "contract" and "agreement" are limited to those relating to the present or future sale of goods.  "Contract for sale" includes both a present sale of goods and a contract to sell goods at a future time.  A "sale" consists in the passing of title from the seller to the buyer for a price (Section 2-401).  A "present sale" means a sale which is accomplished by the making of the contract.

Aggregate level of orders
In their "Advance Monthly Sales for Retail Trade and Food Services", the US Census Bureau publishes estimates of US retail and food services sales. These "sales" are orders that have been filled; payment has been made or is an account receivable.
In their "Preliminary Report on Manufacturers' Shipments, Inventories and Orders", the US Census Bureau publishes statistics for "new orders", shipments, "unfilled orders" and inventories for manufactured durable goods. This gives an indication whether trade is increasing or decreasing for manufactured durable goods in the US.

See also
 Backlog (disambiguation)
 Bill of sale
 Contract of sale
 Delivery order
 Distribution (business)
 Marketing
 Replenishment (disambiguation)
 Supply chain

References

Business terms
Business law